Christophia is a genus of snout moths. It was erected by Émile Louis Ragonot in 1887 and is known from Uzbekistan, and Kazakhstan.

Species
 Christophia ammobia Falkovitsh, 1999
 Christophia callipterella Ragonot, 1887
 Christophia climacopterae Falkovitsh, 1999
 Christophia dattinella Ragonot, 1887
 Christophia ectypella Ragonot, 1888
 Christophia eriopodae Falkovitsh, 1999
 Christophia leucosiphon Falkovitsh, 1999
 Christophia litterella Ragonot, 1887
 Christophia saxauli Falkovitsh, 1999
 Christophia tessulata Falkovitsh, 1999
 Christophia triceratops Falkovitsh, 1999
 Christophia trilineella Ragonot, 1887

References

Phycitini
Pyralidae genera
Taxa named by Émile Louis Ragonot